USS Langley may refer to:

Ships:
, the first aircraft carrier of the United States Navy, converted from the collier Jupiter in 1922, and scuttled in February 1942 after being disabled by the Japanese
, laid down 10 July 1942 and renamed Hammann on 1 August 1942
, a light aircraft carrier commissioned in 1943, active in World War II, and transferred to France in 1951

Others:
USS Langley, a Unix Space Server which provides proof of concept for global internet access via a nanosatellite constellation. The satellite was launched aboard the Atlas V mission designated as USA-261 on 20 May 2015.

United States Navy ship names